Secologanin is a secoiridoid monoterpene synthesized from geranyl pyrophosphate in the mevalonate pathway. Secologanin then proceeds with dopamine or tryptamine to form ipecac and terpene indole alkaloids, respectively.

Biosynthesis
Secologanin biosynthesis begins from geranyl pyrophosphate (GPP) taken from the mevalonate pathway used to make terpenoids. Recent efforts have characterized the entire secologanin biosynthetic pathway. Secologanin is formed from loganin through the action of the enzyme secologanin synthase.  Secologanin is then able to proceed onto produce ipecac and terpene indole alkaloids.

References

Glucosides
Methyl esters
Aldehydes
Vinyl compounds